Sacedón is a city located in the province of Guadalajara, Castile-La Mancha, Spain. According to the 2007 census, the city has a population of 1.758 inhabitants.

References

External links
Sacedón - Diputación de Guadalajara

Municipalities in the Province of Guadalajara